Kaestneriella fumosa is a species of stout barklouse in the family Peripsocidae. It is found in North America.

References

Peripsocidae
Articles created by Qbugbot
Insects described in 1903